Murray Street may refer to:

Places
 Murray Street, Perth, Western Australia
 Murray Street, Hobart, Tasmania, Australia
 Murray Street Historic District, a national historic district located at Mount Morris in Livingston County, New York, U.S.

Others
 Murray Street (album), album by Sonic Youth, a band from New York City